Witham Town Football Club is a semi professional English football club based in Witham, Essex.

History
Clubs named Witham Town have been in existence since the mid 19th century with the original club being disbanded in 1914 due to World War I. The club reformed in 1918 and won the Braintree and District League championship in 1920–21 and 1924–25 as well as the Essex Shield Division Two in 1925–26. They joined the Chelmsford and Mid Essex League (later the Mid-Essex League) and were Division Three champions in 1935–36. They were disbanded again due to the outbreak of World War II.

The club was reformed again after the war and rejoined the Mid-Essex League. They won Division Three in 1947–48 and Division Two the following season. They won the Premier Division cup in 1949–50, but following a dispute with the league over a match played in snowy conditions, the club switched to the South Essex League in 1952. They won the league in 1955–56, before joining the Essex & Suffolk Border League in 1958. They won the ESBL in 1964–65 and 1970–71, as well as the League Cup in 1965–66.

In 1971 they were founder members of the Essex Senior League, and were its inaugural champions. They won the league again in 1985–86 and after finishing as runners-up the following season, were promoted to Division Two North of the Isthmian League in 1987. They remained in Division Two until being relegated to Division Three in 2000, which was renamed Division Two in 2002. After finishing as runners-up in 2005–06 they were promoted to Division One North, where they remained until finishing second from bottom in 2008–09, and being relegated back to the Essex Senior League.

In 2013 Witham Town FC started up youth Football. They are currently being placed into the Blackwater and Dengie League. They have an Under 8's and Under 10's and hope to grow from that with other age groups over the coming years.

On 4 May 2014, they sealed promotion to the Isthmian League Premier division after a 3–0 play-off final win at home against Harlow Town.

Ground
After being reformed after World War II the club initially played on a cow pasture with a barn acting as the changing rooms. During the 1949–50 season the club moved to the Crittall Windows works ground in the Park in the town centre. In 1964 the club decided to seek new playing facilities suitable for senior football and in 1970 was offered its present ground, Spa Road, although the move did not happen until 1975. Witham's record attendance is 898, set in their 2014 play-off victory against Harlow Town.

Former players
See :Category:Witham Town F.C. players

Honours
Essex Senior League
Champions 1971–72, 1985–86, 2011–12
Essex Senior Trophy
Winners 1985–86
Essex & Suffolk Border League
Champions 1964–65, 1970–71
League Cup winners 1965–66
South Essex League
Champions 1955–56
Mid-Essex League
Premier Division Cup winners 1949–50
Division Two champions 1948–49
Division Three champions 1935–36, 1947–48
Braintree and District League
Champions 1920–21, 1924–25

References

External links
Club website

Football clubs in Essex
Football clubs in England
Essex Senior Football League
Isthmian League
Witham
Mid-Essex Football League
South Essex League
North Essex League